Louis Edward Eliasberg, Sr. (February 12, 1896 – February 20, 1976) was an American financier and numismatist. A native of Baltimore, Maryland, he is best known in the numismatic community for putting together the only complete collection of United States coins ever assembled, with attention to coins in the best possible condition.  Although the set was not truly "complete" by modern standards (for instance, it did not differentiate between proofs and circulation strikes as most modern collectors and set registries do, and die variations were not emphasized), it is still the most comprehensive U.S. numismatic collection to date.

There were no exceptions unless one considers the 1849 Double Eagle a coin. This is generally categorized as a pattern coin and only two were made: one is on display at the Smithsonian Institution and the other was given to then Treasury Secretary William M. Meredith but its subsequent whereabouts are unknown. No one had ever accomplished this coin collecting feat before, and probably no one will ever accomplish it again.  There were one or two coins unknown at the time of completion of his collection that were later discovered.

Some of the highlights of the Eliasberg collection include a 1913 Liberty Head nickel known as the "Eliasberg Specimen". The coin was later bought by an unnamed California collector for US$5 million on April 25, 2007. Another is the 1873-CC no-arrows Liberty Seated dime. This coin is also notable for being the last coin needed to complete the Eliasberg collection.

He possessed at one time a 1933 $20 gold coin (one of three then known to be owned by private collectors, including King Farouk of Egypt). Upon learning that the government believed the coins had not been legally issued by the mint and was recalling them, Mr. Eliasberg voluntarily returned his coin to the government in 1952 without compensation. A trial jury in U.S. District Court determined in July 2011 that ten other 1933 double eagles claimed as property by Mrs. Joan Langbord had been obtained illegally by Israel Switt and were property of the United States government. This decision was subsequently upheld the following August.

A generous and knowledgeable correspondent with the coin-collecting public, which became aware of him after a LIFE magazine feature story, Eliasberg was presented with a special trophy by Numismatic Gallery Magazine in recognition of his unique achievement.

He later divided his collection between his two children, who separately sold the collection in three landmark auctions.

References

1896 births
1976 deaths
Collectors
American numismatists